Steinernema xueshanense is a nematode species from the genus of Steinernema. Steinernema xueshanense is named after the Xue Shan mountains.

References

Further reading
 
 

Rhabditida